Henley Borough Police was the police force responsible for policing the borough of Henley in Oxfordshire, England until 1856.

It had been established in 1836 as a result of the Municipal Corporations Act of 1835.  Henley Borough Police was amalgamated into the newly formed Oxfordshire Constabulary as a result of the County and Borough Police Act 1856.

Henley is today policed by the successor to Oxfordshire Constabulary, Thames Valley Police.

See also
List of defunct law enforcement agencies in the United Kingdom

References

Defunct police forces of England
Constabulary